Nicola Colafacio or Nicola de Faciis (died 1476) was a Roman Catholic prelate who served as Bishop of Fondi (1445–1476).

Biography
On 27 January 1445, Nicola Colafacio was appointed during the papacy of Pope Eugene IV as Bishop of Fondi.
He served as Bishop of Fondi until his death in 1476.

Episcopal succession
While bishop, he was the principal co-consecrator of: 
Nicola de Genupia, Bishop of Mottola (1469);
Pierre von Wedberch, Bishop of Ösell (1471); and
Pietro Guglielmo de Rocha, Archbishop of Salerno (1471).

References 

15th-century Italian Roman Catholic bishops
Bishops appointed by Pope Eugene IV
1476 deaths